Delaware Township is a township in Hunterdon County, in the U.S. state of New Jersey. Part of the township is on the Hunterdon Plateau, while the southern portions are in the Amwell Valley. As of the 2020 United States census, the township's population was 4,560, a decrease of three people (−0.1%) from the 2010 census count of 4,563, which in turn reflected an increase of 85 (+1.9%) from the 4,478 counted in the 2000 census.

The historic community of Sergeantsville is located within Delaware Township, as well as the unincorporated community of Raven Rock.

History
The township was first settled in the early 18th century by Colonel John Reading (1657–1717), who was instrumental in the creation of Amwell Township in 1708 and also worked for the creation of Hunterdon County in 1714. The Township adjoins the Delaware River on the southwestern portion of Hunterdon County, which provides its name. The state's lone surviving historic covered bridge, Green Sergeant's Covered Bridge, crosses the Wickecheoke Creek between Sergeantsville and Rosemont.  The Delaware and Raritan Canal parallels the Delaware River along the southern border of the township. Sergeantsville is at the township's center and includes the municipal building, local public school and Post Office. A "Thanksgiving in the Country" offers a tour of notable homes in Sergeantsville, which raises funds for the Facial Reconstruction Unit of the Children's Hospital of Philadelphia.

Delaware was incorporated as a township by an act of the New Jersey Legislature on April 2, 1838, from a portion of a larger municipality then known as Amwell Township (now defunct). Historian and cartographer John P. Snyder has erroneously stated that a referendum was held on that date, but there was in fact no referendum and the people of Amwell knew nothing about the division until after the Legislature passed the bill. A portion of the township was taken to form Stockton borough (April 14, 1898).

Geography
According to the United States Census Bureau, the township had a total area of 37.05 square miles (95.95 km2), including 36.66 square miles (94.94 km2) of land and 0.39 square miles (1.01 km2) of water (1.06%).

Unincorporated communities, localities and place names located partially or completely within the township include Bowne, Brookville, Dilts Corner, Grover, Headquarters, Locktown, Prallsville, Raven Rock, Rosemont, Sand Brook, Sandy Ridge and Sergeantsville.

The township borders the municipalities of East Amwell Township, Franklin Township, Kingwood Township, Lambertville, Raritan Township, Stockton and West Amwell Township in Hunterdon County; as well as Plumstead Township and Solebury Township in Bucks County across the Delaware River in Pennsylvania.

Demographics

2010 census

The Census Bureau's 2006–2010 American Community Survey showed that (in 2010 inflation-adjusted dollars) median household income was $87,100 (with a margin of error of +/− $15,616) and the median family income was $102,481 (+/− $27,024). Males had a median income of $82,586 (+/− $14,105) versus $47,404 (+/− $12,866) for females. The per capita income for the borough was $48,700 (+/− $4,857). About 0.6% of families and 0.6% of the population were below the poverty line, including none of those under age 18 and 0.9% of those age 65 or over.

2000 census
As of the 2000 United States census there were 4,478 people, 1,643 households, and 1,302 families residing in the township.  The population density was 121.9 people per square mile (47.1/km2).  There were 1,701 housing units at an average density of 46.3 per square mile (17.9/km2).  The racial makeup of the township was 97.70% White, 0.40% African American, 0.04% Native American, 1.03% Asian, 0.02% Pacific Islander, 0.25% from other races, and 0.56% from two or more races. Hispanic or Latino of any race were 1.14% of the population.

There were 1,643 households, out of which 33.8% had children under the age of 18 living with them, 71.3% were married couples living together, 4.9% had a female householder with no husband present, and 20.7% were non-families. 14.8% of all households were made up of individuals, and 6.0% had someone living alone who was 65 years of age or older.  The average household size was 2.72 and the average family size was 3.06.

In the township the population was spread out, with 23.4% under the age of 18, 5.9% from 18 to 24, 26.5% from 25 to 44, 32.3% from 45 to 64, and 11.8% who were 65 years of age or older.  The median age was 42 years. For every 100 females, there were 98.8 males.  For every 100 females age 18 and over, there were 100.3 males.

The median income for a household in the township was $80,756, and the median income for a family was $90,842. Males had a median income of $61,701 versus $48,780 for females. The per capita income for the township was $38,285.  3.4% of the population and 2.3% of families were below the poverty line. Out of the total people living in poverty, 1.2% are under the age of 18 and 12.2% are 65 or older.

Government

Local government
Delaware Township is governed under the Township form of New Jersey municipal government, one of 141 municipalities (of the 564) statewide that use this form, the second-most commonly used form of government in the state. The Township Committee is comprised of five members, who are elected directly by the voters at-large in partisan elections to serve three-year terms of office on a staggered basis, with either one or two seats coming up for election each year as part of the November general election in a three-year cycle. At an annual reorganization meeting, the Township Committee selects one of its members to serve as Mayor and another as Deputy Mayor.

, members of the Delaware Township Committee are Mayor James Waltman (R, term on committee ends December 31, 2024; term as mayor ends 2022), Deputy Mayor Charles Herman (R, term on committee ends 2023; term as deputy mayor ends 2022), Chad Bower (R, 2024), Susan D. Lockwood (D, 2020) and Joseph Vocke (R, 2022).

Federal, state and county representation
Delaware Township is located in the 7th Congressional District and is part of New Jersey's 16th state legislative district. Prior to the 2011 reapportionment following the 2010 Census, Delaware Township had been in the 23rd state legislative district.

Politics
As of March 2011, there were a total of 3,558 registered voters in Delaware Township, of which 811 (22.8%) were registered as Democrats, 1,512 (42.5%) were registered as Republicans and 1,232 (34.6%) were registered as Unaffiliated. There were 3 voters registered as Libertarians or Greens.

In the 2012 presidential election, Republican Mitt Romney received 57.4% of the vote (1,618 cast), ahead of Democrat Barack Obama with 41.4% (1,168 votes), and other candidates with 1.2% (33 votes), among the 2,840 ballots cast by the township's 3,724 registered voters (21 ballots were spoiled), for a turnout of 76.3%. In the 2008 presidential election, Republican John McCain received 54.0% of the vote (1,579 cast), ahead of Democrat Barack Obama with 43.8% (1,279 votes) and other candidates with 1.5% (43 votes), among the 2,922 ballots cast by the township's 3,599 registered voters, for a turnout of 81.2%. In the 2004 presidential election, Republican George W. Bush received 57.3% of the vote (1,671 ballots cast), outpolling Democrat John Kerry with 42.2% (1,229 votes) and other candidates with 1.0% (35 votes), among the 2,915 ballots cast by the township's 3,459 registered voters, for a turnout percentage of 84.3.

In the 2013 gubernatorial election, Republican Chris Christie received 71.0% of the vote (1,412 cast), ahead of Democrat Barbara Buono with 26.9% (535 votes), and other candidates with 2.1% (42 votes), among the 2,021 ballots cast by the township's 3,726 registered voters (32 ballots were spoiled), for a turnout of 54.2%. In the 2009 gubernatorial election, Republican Chris Christie received 60.7% of the vote (1,382 ballots cast), ahead of  Democrat Jon Corzine with 29.3% (667 votes), Independent Chris Daggett with 7.9% (179 votes) and other candidates with 1.0% (22 votes), among the 2,277 ballots cast by the township's 3,546 registered voters, yielding a 64.2% turnout.

Education
The Delaware Township School District serves students in pre-kindergarten through eighth grade at Delaware Township School. As of the 2018–19 school year, the district, comprised of one school, had an enrollment of 376 students and 42.3 classroom teachers (on an FTE basis), for a student–teacher ratio of 8.9:1.

Students in ninth through twelfth grades attend the Hunterdon Central High School, part of the Hunterdon Central Regional High School District, which serves students in central Hunterdon County from Delaware Township, East Amwell Township, Flemington Borough, Raritan Township and Readington Township. As of the 2018–19 school year, the high school had an enrollment of 2,844 students and 238.8 classroom teachers (on an FTE basis), for a student–teacher ratio of 11.9:1. Seats on the high school district's nine-member board of education are allocated based in the population of the five constituent municipalities who participate in the school district, with one seat allocated to Delaware Township.

Eighth grade students from all of Hunterdon County are eligible to apply to attend the high school programs offered by the Hunterdon County Vocational School District, a county-wide vocational school district that offers career and technical education at its campuses in Raritan Township and at programs sited at local high schools, with no tuition charged to students for attendance.

Transportation

State and U.S. routes that pass through include Route 12, Route 29 and U.S. Route 202 (including part of the New Hope-Lambertville Toll Bridge).

County routes that traverse the municipality are CR 519, CR 523, CR 579 (which runs along the border between Raritan) and CR 604.

Interstate 78 is outside the township in neighboring Franklin Township.

Notable people

People who were born in, residents of, or otherwise closely associated with Delaware Township include:

 Willard H. Allen (1893–1957), poultry scientist who served as New Jersey secretary of agriculture from 1938 to 1956
 George Newton Best (1846–1926), bryologist, expert on moss taxonomy and second president of the Sullivant Moss Society
 William Cotton (1880–1958), artist and playwright
 Alan B. Handler (born 1931), New Jersey Supreme Court Justice, 1977–1999
 Chet Huntley (1911–1974), radio and television journalist and co-anchor of the Huntley-Brinkley Report on NBC who co-owned a cattle farm which he used as a weekend retreat
 Barbara McConnell (1935–2016), former member of the New Jersey General Assembly and former New Jersey Commissioner of Commerce and Economic Development
 John Schoenherr (1935–2010), award-winning illustrator
 Glenway Wescott (1901–1987), novelist and essayist
 Lloyd Wescott (1907–1990), agriculturalist, civil servant and brother of Glenway Wescott
 Paul Whiteman (1890–1967), big band leader who resided at Walking Horse Farm in Rosemont from 1938 to 1959, before moving to New Hope, Pennsylvania for his remaining years
 Dick Zimmer (born 1944), former member of the United States House of Representatives

References

External links

 
 Hunterdon County web page for Delaware Township
 Delaware Township School
 
 School Data for the Delaware Township School District, National Center for Education Statistics
 Hunterdon Central Regional High School District
 The Delaware Township Post – Community Commentary about life in Delaware Township
 Lumberville-Raven Rock bridge article at the Delaware River Joint Toll Bridge Commission website
 Sergeantsville Volunteer Fire Company, Delaware Township, NJ
 Thanksgiving in the Country – an annual tour of Sergeantsville's historic homes
 Hunterdon Land Trust Alliance

 
1838 establishments in New Jersey
Populated places established in 1838
Township form of New Jersey government
Townships in Hunterdon County, New Jersey
New Jersey populated places on the Delaware River